The Many Sides of Toshiko is a jazz piano trio album by Toshiko Akiyoshi, recorded in New York in 1957 and released on the Verve label.

Track listing
LP side A
"The Man I Love" (G. Gershwin, I. Gershwin) – 5:27
"Minor Moods" ("Midnight Lament") (Brown (Ahmad Kharab Salim)) – 4:16
"After You've Gone" (Layton, Creamer) – 3:35
"We'll Be Together Again" (Fischer, Laine) – 4:29
"Studio J" (Akiyoshi) – 3:15
LP side B
"Tosh's Fantasy" (Akiyoshi) – 9:04
 "Down a Mountain"
 "Phrygian Waterfall"
 "Running Stream"
"Bags' Groove" (Jackson) – 6:48
"Imagination" (Van Heusen, Burke) – 3:35

Personnel
Toshiko Akiyoshi – piano
Jake Hanna – drums
Gene Cherico – bass

References / external links
Allmusic – [ The Many Sides of Toshiko]
Verve MGV-8273

Verve Records albums
Toshiko Akiyoshi albums
1957 albums